Stephen Elliott Rivkin is an American film editor  and music video director best known for his editing work on the Pirates of the Caribbean film series as well as his work with director James Cameron as an editor on Avatar, for which he was nominated for an Academy Award. Rivkin has edited three films for director Norman Jewison as well as has worked extensively with director Gore Verbinski. Stephen Rivkin is an elected member of the American Cinema Editors and currently serves as the President of the organization. He was also associate producer on two films.

Early life and career 
Rivkin's career started in 1976 on the short film, Ain't We Having Fun?. Rivkin went on to graduate in the 1975 class of the Minneapolis College of Art and Design.

Personal life 
Rivkin's brothers are Richard Share and musicians Bobby Z. and David Z.

He is married to Dina Morrone.

Selected filmography

Music videos

Awards & nominations 
2010 - Academy Award Nomination "Film Editing" - Avatar (shared with editors John Refoua and editor/director James Cameron)
2010 - BAFTA Award Nomination "Film Editing" - Avatar (shared with editors John Refoua and editor/director James Cameron)
2010 - American Cinema Editors Nomination "Film Editing" Feature Film (Dramatic) - Avatar (shared with editors John Refoua and editor/director James Cameron)
2008 - American Cinema Editors Nomination "Film Editing" Feature Film - Comedy or Musical - Pirates of the Caribbean: At World's End
2007 - American Cinema Editors Nomination "Film Editing" Feature Film - Comedy or Musical - Pirates of the Caribbean: Dead Man's Chest
2004 - American Cinema Editors Winner "Best Edited Feature Film" - Comedy or Musical - Pirates of the Caribbean: The Curse of the Black Pearl

References 

1955 births
Living people
American Cinema Editors
American film editors
People from Minneapolis